Devils Den Hollow is a valley in Iron County in the U.S. state of Missouri.

Devils Den Hollow was so named on account of its treacherous terrain.

References

Valleys of Iron County, Missouri
Valleys of Missouri